Lévy's modulus of continuity theorem is a theorem that gives a result about an almost sure behaviour of an estimate of the modulus of continuity for Wiener process, that is used to model what's known as Brownian motion.

Lévy's modulus of continuity theorem is named after the French mathematician Paul Lévy.

Statement of the result 
Let  be a standard Wiener process. Then, almost surely,

In other words, the sample paths of Brownian motion have modulus of continuity

with probability one, and for sufficiently small .

See also 
 Some properties of sample paths of the Wiener process

References 

 Paul Pierre Lévy, Théorie de l'addition des variables aléatoires. Gauthier-Villars, Paris (1937).

Probability theorems
theorem